Optical and Quantum Electronics is a peer-reviewed scientific journal published monthly by Springer Science+Business Media. It covers original research and tutorials in optical physics, optoelectronics, photonics, and quantum electronics. Its editors-in-chief are Daoxin Dai, Trevor M. Benson, and Marian Marciniak.

Abstracting and indexing
The journal is abstracted and indexed in different databases, including:
Current Contents/Engineering, Computing & Technology
Inspec
Science Citation Index Expanded
Scopus

According to the Journal Citation Reports, the journal has a 2021 impact factor of 2.794 .

References

External links
 

Optics journals
Springer Science+Business Media academic journals
Publications established in 1969
English-language journals
Monthly journals
Electronics journals